Jeremy Adelman (born 1973) is an American composer for film and television, trumpet player and multi-instrumentalist, and major-label music producer and arranger in genres including funk, indie and jazz. He is primarily known as the composer and songwriter for prime-time CW TV series Hart of Dixie starring Rachel Bilson.

Biography

Early life and career
Adelman was born in Amityville, New York. He performed as an orchestral trumpeter and moved to NY in 1989 to study at the Juilliard School of Music. During this period he cultivated an interest in Jazz and studied further in Manhattan School of Music's world-renowned jazz program.  Jeremy played in local blues, funk and R&B bands amidst the thriving NYC music scene of the early 90s. He then joined the Mercury Record's funk band Milo Z, managed by David Sonenberg, and played shows with legendary artists like Bon Jovi, Al Green, Maceo Parker, The Neville Brothers, The Meters, Chuck Brown & the Soul Searchers & Toots and the Maytals. He would return to Juilliard in 2001 to study composition with Stanley Wolfe.

Composing
In 1996, Adelman composed for the 3rd season of Comedy Central's Viva Variety created by Michael Ian Black, Ben Garant and Thomas Lennon. His job involved composing & producing songs for guest stars to perform and/or sing including Ben Stiller, Shelley Long, Keenen Ivory Wayans, Carmen Electra, Whoopi Goldberg, Martha Stewart, David Cassidy, Buster Poindexter, Bobcat Goldthwait, Robin Leach, Abe Vigoda, Sandra Bernhard, and Erik Estrada.
Jeremy collaborated with tomandandy on various film projects such as Fearless starring Jeff Bridges, Waking the Dead starring Billy Crudup and Jennifer Connelly & Arlington Road starring Tim Robbins.

Indie pop
Adelman has produced and composed with Andy Chase of Ivy for Chase's band Brookville. Even composing the song "Nothing's Meant To Last" with Chase and Brazilian Girls Didi Gutman & Sabina Sciubba. Between 2002-2005, he toured as a member and performer in Brookville, sharing bills with Goldfrapp, Tahiti 80 and even appearing on KCRW's Morning Becomes Eclectic.

In 2003 he began performing as drummer for the band Blondfire and continued to perform as multi-instrumentalist with numerous bands appearing three times on Fearless Music.

Motive
In 2001 he began working directly with ad agencies and created international music production house Motive Music Sound. He has been recognized for his musical compositions in various national and international campaigns with many prestigious awards including the Cannes Grand Prix, two London International Grand Prizes, an Emmy nomination, a Gold Andy, four Silver Clios and a One Show Pencil. He has also served as a panelist for the Billboard Film & TV conference with keynote speaker Clint Eastwood.

Sleepy Rebels
In 2005, he started the band Sleepy Rebels on his label Powerful Company with Bruce Driscoll and Erica Driscoll. The band was successful on national licenses for TV shows and commercials. Soon he got sponsoring from CME's Media Pro Studios to shoot three music videos for the band's songs, "Unbelievable", "Magic Girl" and "Looking Glass". Sleepy Rebels collaborated over the course of three albums, World Record, Yellow Tree and the Christmas themed album, Bah Humbug. Sleepy Rebel's music has been used in ads for J. C. Penney, VW, Tide and many others. J. C. Penney chose to make the Sleepy Rebels' song "Unbelievable" their theme song for 2009.

Trivia
Jeremy's father Howard Adelman was the medical examiner in the event that was made into the movie The Amityville Horror.

Discography
 1994 - Milo Z - Basic Need to Howl - Trumpet
 2000 - Anthony Robustelli - Trumpet
 2002 - Bree Sharp - More B.S. - Horn, Trumpet
 2002 - Rachael Sage - Flugelhorn, Trumpet
 2004 - Paco - This Is Where We Live - Horn, Horn Arrangements, Group Member
 2004 - Eugene Mirman - The Absurd Nightclub Comedy of Eugene Mirman - Composer
 2005 - JJ Sansaverino - Sunshine After Midnight - Trumpet
 2005 - Ashby - Looks Like You've Already Won - Horn, Horn Arrangements, Producer
 2005 - Ivy - In the Clear - Additional Personnel, Guest Artist, Trumpet
 2006 - The Mosquitos - Mosquitos III - Flugelhorn, Horn
 2006 - Ezekial - Love and War - Trumpet
 2006 - Brookville (band) - Life In The Shade - Synthesizer, Producer, Engineer, Drum Programming, Composer "Nothing's Meant To Last"
 2008 - Blondfire - My Someday - Trumpet
 2008 - Sleepy Rebels - World Record - Producer, Composer, Instrumentation, Vocals, Mixer, Group Member
 2009 - Brookville (band) - Broken Lights - Composer, Programming
 2010 - Lana Mír - Composer, Instrumentation
 2012 - Sleepy Rebels - Bah Humbug! - Producer, Composer, Instrumentation, Vocals, Mixer, Group Member
 2011 - Sleepy Rebels - Yellow Tree - Producer, Composer, Instrumentation, Vocals, Mixer, Group Member
 2021 - Women of Tomorrow - album with Laura Bell Bundy - Producer, Composer, instrumentation, Vocals, Mixer, programmer

Filmography
 1997 - Viva Variety (TV Series) - Composer
 1999 - Freakshow (Short) - Composer
 2003 - Spot: The Professional (Short) - Composer
 2005 - Turning Green - Performer
 2006 - First Person Killers: Ronald DeFeo (TV Movie Documentary) - Composer
 2008 - Fire & Ice - Soundtrack
 2009 - Private Practice (TV Series) - Soundtrack
 2009 - Weekend with my Mother (Feature Film) - Composer
 2012 - A Conversation About Cheating with My Time Traveling Future Self (Short) - Composer
 2012 - Sweet Little Lies :aka Minte-Ma Frumos (Feature Film) - Composer
 2011 - 2015 - Hart of Dixie (TV Series) (49 Episodes) - Composer
 2013 - Stupid Hype (TV Movie) - Composer
 2014 - L.A. Rangers (TV Series) - Composer
 2015 - Skits-O-Frenic (TV Series) - Composer
 2015 - Becoming Santa (TV Movie) - Composer 
 2015 - Anti_Social (Short) - Composer
 2017 - The Wanderers: The Quest of the Demon Hunter - Composer
 2017 - The Story of Us with Morgan Freeman - Composer, additional music 
 2019 - The World Without You (Feature Film) directed by Damon Shalit- Composer

References

External links
 Official site
 Twitter
 Motive Music Sound website
 Jeremy Adelman on Allmusic
 Official Hart of Dixie site
 Official Sleepy Rebels website
 Sleepy Rebels Unbelievable music video in Paste Magazine

Record producers from New York (state)
American audio engineers
Living people
1973 births
Musicians from New York (state)
People from Amityville, New York
Engineers from New York (state)